Albert Hassell (born 19 March 1936) is a Barbadian cricketer. He played in one first-class match for the Barbados cricket team in 1955/56.

See also
 List of Barbadian representative cricketers

References

External links
 

1936 births
Living people
Barbadian cricketers
Barbados cricketers
Cricketers from Bridgetown